Meyer Kotkin is an American North American champion bridge player and an American Contract Bridge League (ACBL) Grand Life Master.

Bridge accomplishments

Wins
 North American Bridge Championships (2)
 Wernher Open Pairs (1) 2011 
 Truscott Senior Swiss Teams (1) 2022

Personal life
Meyer is married with two children.

References

American contract bridge players
Living people
1955 births